Car Nicobar Tehsil (Pu in the local language) is one of three local administrative divisions of the Indian district of Nicobar, part of the Indian union territory of Andaman and Nicobar Islands.
It is a subdivision  and also a tehsil, roughly equivalent to a county in its range of administrative powers. It is located in the Northern Nicobar Islands.

Administration
Politically, The Tehsil includes the islands of Car Nicobar, along neighboring Battimalv Island.

Image gallery

References 

Tehsils of the Andaman and Nicobar Islands
Nicobar district